David Hunter (16 November 1858 – 20 September 1927) was an Australian politician. He was the conservative member for Woolloongabba in the Legislative Assembly of Queensland from 1908 to 1912.

Hunter is buried in Bulimba Cemetery.

References

1858 births
1927 deaths
Members of the Queensland Legislative Assembly
Place of birth missing
Burials in Balmoral Cemetery, Brisbane